Peter Hein (born 18 December 1943) is a German rower who represented East Germany. He competed at the 1968 Summer Olympics in Mexico City with the men's eight where they came seventh.

References

1943 births
Living people
People from Anklam
People from the Province of Pomerania
German male rowers
Sportspeople from Mecklenburg-Western Pomerania
Olympic rowers of East Germany
Rowers at the 1968 Summer Olympics
World Rowing Championships medalists for East Germany
European Rowing Championships medalists